Cristina Peña Raigal (born 27 July 1976) is a Spanish stage, film, and television actress.

Biography
She studied at the Juan Carlos Corazza school. She began in the interpretation with small roles on films and TV series (Manos a la obra, Médico de familia or El comisario).

Her first major role was as the protagonist in the 2001 short film Dame cambio. The same year Peña filmed the TV series Compañeros (Antena 3) and took part in the series until 2002, becoming a well known face to the audience. Peña then acted in several roles in film and television, for example 7 vidas (Telecinco), until 2006, when she collaborated on the TV program El Intermedio (LaSexta). After she returned to the television series.

Personal life
She was formerly married to the actor Enrique Arce. Peña has one daughter with musician Pachi Delgado. She is married with businessman Livio Lo Monaco with whom she had a daughter, Adriana (2012).

Filmography

Films
Gitano (2000, as Prostitute)
Dame Cambio (2001, as Vanesa)
Peor imposible, ¿qué puede fallar? (2002, as Chica calle tarde)
Cuestión de química (2007)
Trío de ases: el secreto de la Atlántida (2008, as Salimbna)

Television
Médico de familia (1999)
Al salir de clase (1999, as Michelle)
El comisario (1999 – 2002, as Adela / Ana / Charlie's friend)
Compañeros (2001 – 2002, as Jose)
Tres son multitud (2003, as Bárbara Montes)
Casi Perfectos (2004 – 2005, as Carmen)
Aída (2005, as Remedios)
Obsesión (2005)
7 vidas (2005 – 2006, as Irene)
LEX (2008, as Sara Segovia)
El Intermedio (2006–2008) 
Somos cómplices (2009, as Soledad Méndez) 
Las chicas de oro (2010)
Alfonso, el príncipe maldito (2010, as Carmen Martínez-Bordiú)  
Seis motivos para dudar de tus amigos (2011)
Los misterios de Laura (2011–present, as Verónica Lebrel)
BuenAgente (2011)
Gran Reserva (2013, as forensics)
Bienvenidos al Lolita (2014–present, as Norma)

Theater 
 The Pelopidas
 A la caza de la extranjera 
 La otra costilla 
 La casa de Bernarda Alba 
 Así en los parques como en el cielo 
 5 mujeres.com (2005) 
 Hombres, mujeres y punto (2006) 
 The Taming of the Shrew (2009) 
 Rumors (2011) 
 Se infiel y no mires con quién (2011) 
 Violines y trompetas (2012)
 Ni contigo... Sin ni Ti' (2012)

References

External links
 

1976 births
People from Granada
Living people
Spanish television actresses
Spanish film actresses
Spanish stage actresses
21st-century Spanish actresses